Thittacheri is a town panchayat in Nagapattinam district in the Indian state of Tamil Nadu.

Demographics
According to the 2011 Census of India, Thittacheri had a total population of 9,245. Males constitute 48.2% of the population and females 51.8%. Thittacheri has an average literacy rate of 78.42%, higher than the national average of 74.04%: male literacy is 82.65%, and female literacy is 74.5%. In Thittacheri, 11.8% of the population is under 6 years of age. The town had a total of 1,985 households. Muslims are the majority of the population and Tamil is the predominant language.

References

Cities and towns in Nagapattinam district